Muzaffer Badalıoğlu (13 November 1960 – 20 January 1989) was a Turkish footballer who last played as a defender for Samsunspor, and also appeared for the Turkey national football team.

The Samsunspor team bus was involved in a traffic accident in Havza on the way to a match in Malatya on 20 January 1989, killing the team coach, five players and the bus driver instantly. Badalıoğlu was one of the players who died.

References

1960 births
1989 deaths
Turkish footballers
Turkey international footballers
Samsunspor footballers
Süper Lig players
Road incident deaths in Turkey
Association football defenders
People from Havza